Richard Moir (born 1950) is an Australian former actor and editor. He is known for many Australian film roles and in TV soap opera Prisoner (also known as Prisoner: Cell Block H) as original character of electrician Eddie Cook and in children's comedy  Round the Twist as "Dad" Tony Twist.

Personal life
In 1990, Moir was diagnosed with Parkinson's disease, the degenerative effects of which gradually brought his acting career to a premature end. Moir later underwent deep brain stimulation therapy, a process covered by the 2006 documentary The Bridge At Midnight Trembles.

He was married to Julie Nihill and they had two daughters.

Filmography

Film
27A (1974) Richard
In Search of Anna (1978) Tony
The Odd Angry Shot (1979) Medic
The Chain Reaction (1980) Jr. Const. Pigott
Heatwave (1982) Stephen West
Sweet Dreamers (1982) Will Daniels
Running On Empty (1982) Fox
Going Down (1982) Hotel night manager
The Plains of Heaven (1982) Barker
With Prejudice (1983) Middleton
Wrong World (1985) David Trueman
An Indecent Obsession (1985) Luce Daggett
The Long Way Home (1985, TV Movie) Bob
Jilted (1987) Al
Minnamurra (1989) Bill Thompson
Isabelle Eberhardt (1991) Lt. Comte
Deadly (1991) Willie the Pathologist
Welcome to Woop Woop (1997) Reggie
Joey (1997) School Teacher

Television
The Restless Years (1978) Curley
Prisoner (part of the original cast in 1979) Eddie Cook
Players in the Gallery (1980, TV Movie) David
1915 (1982) Rev. Fox
Alterations (1988, TV Movie) Richard
Round the Twist (1989-1992) Tony Twist
Dolphin Cove (1989)
The Big Wish (1990, TV Movie) The King
Law of the Land (1993) Sgt Clive O'Connor

References

External links
 

1950 births
Australian people of French descent
Australian male film actors
Australian male soap opera actors
Living people
Male actors from Queensland
People with Parkinson's disease
20th-century Australian male actors